Raw is a brand of the American professional wrestling promotion WWE that was established on March 25, 2002. Brands are divisions of WWE's roster where wrestlers are assigned to perform on a weekly basis when a brand extension is in effect. Wrestlers assigned to Raw primarily appear on the brand's weekly television program, Monday Night Raw, also referred to simply as Raw. It is one of WWE's two main brands, along with SmackDown, collectively referred to as WWE's main roster. The brand was discontinued for a period between August 2011 and July 2016.

In addition to Raw's main television program, less-utilized wrestlers also appear on the brand's supplementary show, Main Event. Raw's wrestlers also perform on the branded and co-branded pay-per-view and livestreaming events. During the first brand split (2002–2011), Raw wrestlers also competed on the former supplementary show, Heat, and on ECW under a talent exchange program with the former ECW brand, while during the second brand split (2016–present), the brand's wrestlers have appeared in the interbrand Worlds Collide,  Mixed Match Challenge, and annual Tribute to the Troops events. Additionally during the second split, Raw's cruiserweight wrestlers competed on 205 Live when WWE's revived cruiserweight division was exclusive to Raw from 2016 to 2018 before 205 Live became its own brand.

History

First split (2002–2011) 

In early-to-mid-2002, then World Wrestling Federation (WWF) underwent a process they called the "brand extension". The WWF divided itself into two de facto wrestling promotions with separate rosters, storylines and authority figures. Raw and SmackDown! would host each division, give its name to the division and essentially compete against each other. The split came about as a result of the WWF purchasing their two biggest competitors, World Championship Wrestling (WCW) and Extreme Championship Wrestling (ECW); and the subsequent doubling of its roster and championships. The brand extension was publicly announced by Linda McMahon during a telecast of Raw on March 25 and became official the next day.

At the time, this excluded the WWE Undisputed Championship and the original WWE Women's Championship as those WWE titles would be defended on both shows. In September 2002, then WWE Undisputed Champion Brock Lesnar refused to defend the title on Raw, in effect causing his title to become exclusive to SmackDown. The following week on Raw, Raw General Manager Eric Bischoff awarded a newly instated World Heavyweight Championship to Raw's designated number one contender Triple H. Because the WWE Undisputed Championship was now a SmackDown exclusive title, it was no longer referred to as "undisputed". Following this, the original WWE Women's Championship soon became a Raw exclusive title as well. As a result of the brand extension, an annual "draft lottery" was instituted to exchange members of each roster and generally refresh the lineups.

Raw was the home brand for many top WWE stars including  Triple H, Ric Flair, Batista, Randy Orton, Chris Benoit, Goldberg,  Booker T, Chris Jericho, Christian, Shawn Michaels, John Cena, Kane, Trish Stratus, Lita and Stacy Keibler.

The 2005 draft was held on the June 6 episode of Raw. The first draft lottery pick was then WWE Champion John Cena, thus moving the WWE Championship to Raw and having two titles on the brand. Eventually, then World Heavyweight Champion Batista was drafted to SmackDown as the last draft pick, leaving only the WWE Championship on Raw. In the 2008 draft lottery, CM Punk got drafted to Raw and then won the World Heavyweight Championship from Edge, who was a SmackDown wrestler. Triple H, who was the WWE Champion at the time, got drafted to SmackDown while Kane, who was the then ECW Champion, got drafted to Raw. After the draft lottery in 2009, the WWE Championship was brought back to Raw when Triple H was drafted from SmackDown while the World Heavyweight Championship was brought back to SmackDown when Edge defeated John Cena to win the title at Backlash.

On the August 29, 2011, episode of Raw, it was announced that performers from Raw and SmackDown were no longer exclusive to their respective brand. Subsequently, championships previously exclusive to one show or the other were available for wrestlers from any show to compete for—this would mark the end of the brand extension as all programming and live events featured the full WWE roster. In a 2013 interview with Advertising Age, Stephanie McMahon explained that WWE's decision to end the brand extension was due to wanting their content to flow across television and online platforms.

Second split (2016–present) 
On May 25, 2016, it was announced that WWE would be reintroducing the brand split in July, with distinctive rosters for both Raw and SmackDown. On the July 11 episode of Raw, Vince McMahon named Stephanie McMahon the Commissioner of Raw. The draft took place on the live premiere of SmackDown on July 19, with the General Managers of the respective brands hand-picking the wrestlers for their brands. Raw's Commissioner Stephanie McMahon and General Manager Mick Foley created a new championship—the WWE Universal Championship. This championship would be exclusive to the Raw brand, as the WWE World Championship had become exclusive to the SmackDown brand. Clash of Champions was scheduled as the reintroduction of the cruiserweight division and the first Raw-exclusive pay-per-view since January 2007, whereas Elimination Chamber was scheduled as the final Raw-exclusive pay-per-view two years later. Subsequently, this saw all upcoming pay-per-views interbranded after WrestleMania 34.

After SmackDown moved to Fox in October 2019, Raw lost its status as the main "A" Show.

Beginning in December 2021, talents from Raw begin to appear on NXT 2.0. Dave Meltzer of the Wrestling Observer Radio reported that a Raw-NXT crossover between their talents as a way to help boost NXT 2.0 ratings as both shows air on the USA Network.

Champions 
Initially, the WWE Undisputed Championship and the original WWE Women's Championship were available to both brands. The other championships were exclusive to the brand the champion was a part of. When the brand extension began, Raw received the Intercontinental Championship and the European Championship when their respective holders were drafted. In September 2002, the WWE Undisputed Championship became the WWE Championship again and was moved to SmackDown, prompting Raw General Manager Eric Bischoff to create the World Heavyweight Championship for Raw. Shortly thereafter, Raw became the exclusive brand for the World Tag Team Championship, the Intercontinental Championship and the original WWE Women's Championship.

On July 19, 2016, the brand extension was brought back and for the first time ever the draft was held on SmackDown Live. Raw drafted the WWE Women's Championship, the United States Championship and the WWE Tag Team Championship. With the WWE Championship being defended exclusively on SmackDown, Stephanie McMahon and Mick Foley introduced the WWE Universal Championship to be Raw's world title. At Crown Jewel on October 31, 2019, SmackDown wrestler "The Fiend" Bray Wyatt won the WWE Universal Championship, thus taking the title to SmackDown. On the next night's episode of SmackDown, WWE Champion Brock Lesnar quit SmackDown and moved to Raw, bringing the title with him.

Current championships 

Note – The WWE Women's Tag Team Championship can also be defended on Raw as it is shared among the brands

Previous championships

Personnel

Pay-per-view and WWE Network events

First brand split events

Second brand split events

Notes

References 

WWE Raw
WWE brands
2002 establishments in the United States
2011 disestablishments in the United States
2016 establishments in the United States